Megan Jastrab (born January 29, 2002) is an American professional racing cyclist, who currently rides for UCI Women's WorldTeam . In September 2019, Jastrab won the women's junior road race at the 2019 UCI Road World Championships in Yorkshire, England.

In June 2021, she qualified  to represent the United States at the 2020 Summer Olympics.

Major results

2019
 1st  Road race, UCI Junior Road World Championships
 UCI Junior Track World Championships
1st  Madison (with Zoe Ta-Perez)
1st  Omnium
 National Junior Road Championships
1st  Road race
2nd  Time trial
 1st  Overall Healthy Ageing Tour Juniors
1st  Points classification
1st  Young rider classification
1st Stages 1 & 3
 1st Piccolo Trofeo Alfredo Binda
 2nd Gent–Wevelgem Junioren

References

External links

2002 births
Living people
American female cyclists
People from Apple Valley, California
Cyclists at the 2020 Summer Olympics
Medalists at the 2020 Summer Olympics
Olympic bronze medalists for the United States in cycling